Qinnguata Kuussua is a river in a valley of the same name in the Qeqqata municipality in central-western Greenland. Its source is a large meltwater outflow from Russell Glacier flowing from the Greenland Ice Sheet. It is the main river in the Kangerlussuaq area. The climate is polar continental, with the area receiving very little rainfall.

Geography 
Several meltwater outflow streams from the southern base of the Russell Glacier form the Qinnguata Kuussua river. From the north it is bounded by an exposed, barren, and flattened ridge of Akuliarusiarsuk.

The lower part of the valley narrows down in the gorge between Akuliarusiarsuk ridge in the north, and Qaarsorsuaq ridge in the south, which separates the valley from lake Tasersuatsiaq and the Ammalortup Nunaa highland beyond.

Tributaries 
Its main tributary is the Akuliarusiarsuup Kuua river − another, more northerly outflow from Russell Glacier. During the operating years of the American Bluie West Eight base at Kangerlussuaq, the lower part of the river flow past the confluence was referred to as Watson River.  The confluence at  forms a small sandur basin with large fields of glacial silt quicksand.

Estuary 

The estuary of the river is very narrow, forcing its way through a rock barrier at high speed, discharging silt, which subsequently forms quicksand islet patches at the end of the Kangerlussuaq Fjord.

Floods 
The river is prone to flooding in the summer, sometimes significantly. On 31 August 2007 one of the temporary meltwater outflow lakes near Russell Glacier broke the ice barrier, emptying into the upper basin of the river, with the latter flooding the valley.

References 

Kangerlussuaq
Rivers of Greenland
Valleys of Greenland